Malkauns, known also as  rag Malkosh, is a raga in Indian classical music. It is one of the oldest ragas of Indian classical music. The equivalent raga in Carnatic music is called Hindolam, not to be confused with the Hindustani Hindol.

According to Indian classical vocalist Pandit Jasraj, Malkauns is a raga that is "sung during small hours of the morning, just after midnight." He further adds that the raga has a soothing and intoxicating effect.

Etymology 
The name Malkaush is derived from the combination of Mal and Kaushik, which means he who wears serpents like garlands – the god Shiva. However, the Malav-Kaushik mentioned in classical texts does not appear to be the same as the Malkauns performed today. The raga is believed to have been created by goddess Parvati to calm lord Shiva, when he was outraged and refused to calm down after Tandav in rage of Sati's sacrifice.

In Jainism, it is also stated that the Raga Malkauns is used by the Tirthankaras with the Ardhamāgadhi Language when they are giving Deshna (Lectures) in the Samavasarana.

Malkaush belongs to Shaivait musical school; in fact most pentatonic ragas belong to Shaivait musical school.

Arohana and Avarohana 
Malkauns belongs to the Bhairavi thaat. Its notes are Sa, komal Ga, shuddh Ma, komal Dha, and komal Ni. In Western classical notation, its notes can be denoted as: tonic, minor third, perfect fourth, minor sixth and minor seventh. In raga Malkauns, Rishabh (Re – second) and Pancham (Pa – perfect fifth) are completely omitted. Its jaati is audav-audav (five-five, that is, pentatonic).

Arohana : 

Avarohana : 

The 'Ga' used is actually Ga-Sadharan (the rough minor third), 316-cent above Sa. This corresponds to the note ga2, in the 22 shrutis list, with a factor of 6/5.

Vadi and Samavadi 
The vadi swara is Madhyam (Ma) while the Samavadi swara is Shadaj (Sa).

Pakad or Chalan 
Pakad :

Other characteristics 

Malkauns is a serious, meditative raga, and is developed mostly in the lower octave (mandra saptak) and in a slow tempo (vilambit laya). Ornaments such as meend, gamak and andolan are used rather than 'lighter' ornaments such as murki and khatka. Komal Ni is generally considered the starting note (graha swara), and the notes komal Ga and komal Dha are performed with vibrato (andolit). All five swaras can function as pausing notes.

The komal Ni in Malkauns is different from the komal Ni in Bhimpalasi.

The best time for this raga is late night. The effect of the raga is soothing and intoxicating.

List of ragas in the Kauns family 
The unique musical structure of Malkauns has given rise to many variations, creating what may be called a 'Kauns' family of related ragas.
 Chandrakauns 
 Bageshri-Ang Chandrakauns 
 Nandkauns 
 Sampoorna Malkauns 
 Pancham Malkauns
 Gunkauns
 Madhukauns
 Jogkauns 
 Nirmalkauns
 Tulsikauns

Film songs 
'Man Tarpat Hari Darshan Ko Aaj' (film Baiju Bawra, performed by Mohammad Rafi), 'Aadha Hai Chandrama Raat Aadhi' (film Navrang, performed by Mahendra Kapoor and Asha Bhosle), 'Chham Chham Ghunghroo Bole' (film Kaajal, performed by Asha Bhosle), 'Ankhiyan Sang Ankhiyaan Laagi Aaj' (film Bada Aadmi), 'Balma Maane Na' (film Opera House) and 'Rang raliyaan karat sautan sang' (film Birbal My Brother), 'Ek Ladki Thi' (film Love You Hamesha, performed by Kavita Krishnamurthy) are a few Hindi film compositions based on Malkauns.
'Rajasekhara' in the film 'Anarkali' in Tamil and Telugu is a composition based on this in South India. "Ohm Namashivaya" and "Margazhi Poove" songs in Tamil by Illayaraja and AR Rahman from Salangai Oli and May Madham respectively,""Neenu Neene" song from the movie Gadibidi Ganda, "Ra Ra" song in the movie Apthamitra in Kannada are also the best examples.

Tamil Film Songs
Note that the following songs are composed in Hindolam, the equivalent of raga Malkauns in Carnatic music.

Compositions of Hindustani Classical Music

Important recordings 
 Amir Khan, Ragas Hansadhwani and Malkauns, HMV LP (long-playing record), EMI-EASD1357
 Mekaal Hasan Band's Maalkauns from the album Andholan is also based on this.
 Ustad Mubarak Ali Khan presented it in a popular bandish "Aaj more Ghar aaye na Balma"

References

External links 
 Film Songs in Rag Malkauns
 More details about raga Malkouns

Literature 
 

Hindustani ragas